Marsol (aka Marisol) is a natural chestnut hybrid, a cross between a European chestnut (Castanea sativa) and Japanese (Castanea crenata) (CA 07).

INRA produced this variety from Lalevade-d'Ardèche.  It is mainly used as a rootstock because of its good graft compatibility with many varieties.  As a rootstock, it is more vigorous than Maraval (equal to Bouche de Betizac or Comballe).

Trees are resistant to rust and roots have some resistance to ink disease.  Marsol is the most sensitive chestnut cultivary to Dryocosmus kuriphilus - the chestnut gall wasp, and very sensitive to the codling moth, fairly sensitive to root asphyxiation, resistant to mosaic virus, slightly susceptible to chestnut blight.

Trees are of medium height with a long trunk and branches higher up.  Early bud breaks makes the shoot development sensitive to spring frosts. The male catkins flower from June 19–30 June followed by female flowers June 27 - July 8.  The male catkins are pollen sterile.

Nut production of grafted trees is medium with higher production on seedling trees.  Nut production starts at four to five years.  The triangular nuts are mid season ripening - shiny red mahogany in color.  They keep and peel well. The nuts can be used fresh or for processing.  The nut taste is described as lower quality.  Occurrence of double embryos (pericarp splitting) is less than 5%.

Vegetative multiplication is quite easy.

References

 Anagnostakis,  Sandra L.  The Connecticut Agricultural Experiment Station CULTIVARS OF CHESTNUT, 2013, accessed 2017

 Breisch, Henri; "Châtaignes et marrons" - editor CTIFL - 1995
Craddock, J.H. and Bassi, G.  (1999)  Effect of clonally propagated interspecific hybrid chestnut rootstocks on short-term graft incompatibility with four cultivars of Italian "Marrone".  In: Salesses, G. (ed.) Proc. 2nd International Chestnut Symposium, Bordeaux, France.  Acta Horticulturae 494: 207-121 
 SWEET CHESTNUT (Castanea)
 Hennion, B.; Chestnut production in France: review, perspectives.; Acta Horticulturae                                        2010                                                                                No.866                                        pp. 493–497                                        ref.3 
 Osterc, G; Phenolic content in cuttings of two clones of hybrid chestnut (Castanea crenata×Castanea sativa) in the first days after cutting severance, Journal Acta Agriculturae Scandinavica, Section B Volume 58, 2008 - Issue 2 
 Pereira-Lorenzo S. et al. (2012) Chestnut. In: Badenes M., Byrne D. (eds) Fruit Breeding. Handbook of Plant Breeding, vol 8. Springer, Boston, MA 
Sartor, C ; Impact of the Asian wasp Dryocosmus kuriphilus (Yasumatsu) on cultivated chestnut: Yield loss and cultivar susceptibility;  Scientia Horticulturae; Volume 197, 14 December 2015, Pages 454-460 
 Solar, A et al.; GRAFTING AND PERFORMANCE IN THE FIRST YEAR OF 'MARSOL' GRAFTED ONTO DIFFERENT ROOTSTOCKS ; Acta Horticulturae  866; 2010; accessed 2020
 Vannini, Andrea  and Vettraino, Anna Maria; Ink disease in chestnuts: impact on the European chestnut; Forest Snow and Landscape Research 76, 3: 345–350 (2001)

Chestnut cultivars
Edible nuts and seeds